Halling may refer to:

 Halling (dance), a dance, mainly Norwegian
 Halling (horse) (born 1991), Thoroughbred racehorse
 Halling (person), a person from Hallingdal, Norway
 Halling (surname)
 Halling, character in Stargate Atlantis, List of Stargate Atlantis characters#Athosians

People
 William Halling, a Danish nabob and landowner

Places 
 Halling, Kent, a village in England
 Halling-lès-Boulay, a village in Moselle Department, France
 Halling, Moselle a locality of Puttelange-lès-Thionville, Moselle
 Halling railway station, a railway station in the southeastern United Kingdom, on the Medway Valley Line